Adèle Haenel (born 11 February 1989) is a French actress. She is the recipient of several accolades, including two César Awards from seven nominations and one Lumières Award from two nominations.

Haenel began her career as a child actress, making her film debut with Les Diables (2002) at the age of 12, and quickly rose to prominence in the French entertainment industry as a teenager. She received her first César Award nomination for her performance in Water Lilies (2007), which also marked the beginning of her long professional and personal relationship with director Céline Sciamma. In 2014, Haenel received her first César Award for her supporting role in Suzanne, and in 2015 won the César Award for Best Actress for Love at First Fight. She continued to garner recognition for her performances in BPM (Beats per Minute) (2017), The Trouble with You (2018) and Portrait of a Lady on Fire (2019).

Early life 
Haenel was born on 11 February 1989 in Paris. Her mother is a teacher and her father is a translator. She grew up in Montreuil, Seine-Saint-Denis in what she described as "a very left-wing, artistic neighborhood". She has Austrian heritage through her father and speaks fluent German. Haenel started acting at the age of 5 and was involved in local theatre. As a child, Haenel would mimic cartoon characters, particularly the characters of Tex Avery.

Haenel studied economics and social sciences at the Lycée Montaigne. She had planned to attend HEC Paris and took a preparatory course, but ultimately failed the entrance exam. Haenel continued her studies in economics and sociology, eventually receiving a master's degree. She also pursued studies in physics and marine biology.

Career 
Haenel made her film debut in 2002 at the age of 12, playing an autistic girl in the Christophe Ruggia film Les Diables. She had been chosen for the lead role after accompanying her brother to the audition. After Les Diables, Haenel took a five-year break from acting. In 2007, she was persuaded by casting director Christel Baras (who had cast her in her film debut) to resume her film career, taking up the part of a synchronised swimmer in Céline Sciamma's debut feature Water Lilies. Manohla Dargis of The New York Times highlighted Haenel's performance in an otherwise mixed review of the film, recognizing her as having "the makings of a real star". For her role in the film, Haenel was nominated for the César Award for Most Promising Actress in 2008. In 2012, she was nominated in the same category for House of Tolerance (2011), a period film directed by Bertrand Bonello, in which she played a prostitute at an upscale Parisian brothel at the turn of the twentieth century. She also received the Lumières Award for Most Promising Actress along with her co-stars Céline Sallette and Alice Barnole.

Haenel played one of the two sisters in Katell Quillévéré's Suzanne (2013), for which she received the César Award for Best Supporting Actress. In 2014, Haenel starred in the Thomas Cailley romantic comedy Love at First Fight as Madeleine, a graduate-school dropout and survivalist. She won the César Award for Best Actress for her performance. In the same year, Haenel co-starred with Catherine Deneuve in André Téchiné's crime drama In the Name of My Daughter, playing the daughter of a casino owner. Writing for The Village Voice, Melissa Anderson compared her performance to that of Isabelle Adjani's in the 1970s and '80s, and declared her a worthy successor to Deneuve in French cinema. For her roles in both films, Hanael received a Best Actress nomination at the 20th Lumières Awards.

In 2016 Haenel made her German language debut in the film The Bloom of Yesterday playing the French descendant of German Holocaust survivors.

In the 2017 Robin Campillo film BPM (Beats per Minute), Haenel portrayed Sophie, a headstrong HIV/AIDS activist of the Paris chapter of ACT UP. She received a nomination for the César Award for Best Supporting Actress for her performance.

Haenel starred in the 2018 Pierre Salvadori crime comedy The Trouble with You, playing a widowed detective based on the French Riviera. David Rooney of The Hollywood Reporter noted her performance as evoking the "classic screwball heroine", a departure from her usually more serious roles, and complimented her on the "grace and buoyancy" she brought to the character. She was again nominated for the César Award for Best Actress.

In 2019, Haenel appeared in three films which played at the Cannes Film Festival: Quentin Dupieux's Deerskin, Aude Léa Rapin's Heroes Don't Die, and Céline Sciamma's Portrait of a Lady on Fire. In Portrait of a Lady on Fire, Haenel portrayed Héloïse, a young aristocrat in 18th-century Brittany who is to be married off to a nobleman from Milan. The New Yorker'''s Richard Brody took note of her chemistry with co-star Noémie Merlant and complimented the actresses for being "relentlessly graceful, endowed with physical aplomb, contemplative insight, and strong emotion". A. O. Scott of The New York Times considered Haenel's performance worthy of an Oscar nomination for Best Actress, and Bilge Ebiri of Vulture described the climax of the film (which features Haenel) as "one of the finest pieces of acting and one of the most moving images I've seen in eons." Haenel was nominated for the César Award for Best Actress for her performance, her seventh César nomination.

Since 2019, Haenel and co-star Ruth Vega Fernandez have prepared to perform director Gisèle Vienne's adaptation of Robert Walser's L'Etang (The Pond) for theatres in France and Switzerland. After performances were repeatedly delayed or cancelled by restrictions necessitated by the COVID-19 pandemic, the play made its world premiere at the Théâtre Vidy-Lausanne in Switzerland in May 2021.

In May 2022, during an interview for German magazine FAQ, Haenel told that she was stepping away from film acting as "I tried to change something from within. [...] I don't want to be part of that anymore”. She cited the industry as "[defending] a capitalist, patriarchal, racist, sexist world of structural inequality. This means that this industry works hand in hand with the global economic order, in which all lives are not equal". Haenel's last project was to be The Empire, written and directed by Bruno Dumont, but she explained that she left the film as "it was a dark, sexist and racist world that was defended. The script was full of jokes about cancel culture and sexual violence. I tried to discuss it with Dumont, because I thought a dialogue was possible. I wanted to believe for the umpteenth time that it was not intentional. But it's intentional. [...] Just as they make fun of the victims, of people in a situation of weakness. The intention was to make a sci-fi film with an all-white cast – and therefore a racist narrative. I didn't want to support this." Haenel indicated that she was focused on theatre work.

 Personal life 
In 2014, Haenel came out as a lesbian during her César award acceptance speech and acknowledged her relationship with director Céline Sciamma, whom she met on the set of Water Lilies. The couple amicably split in 2018, before they began work on Portrait of a Lady on Fire. Haenel and Sciamma have remained close after the end of their relationship.

Haenel identifies as a feminist. She is a prominent face of France's #MeToo movement, and was the first prominent actress to speak publicly about abuse within the French film industry. In a November 2019 Mediapart interview, Haenel accused director Christophe Ruggia of sexually harassing her from the time she was 12 to 15 after casting her in his film Les Diables. Following the experience, she considered abandoning acting altogether. Haenel's account was backed up by many people who had worked on the film and noted Ruggia's inappropriate behaviour towards her, along with letters he had written her at the time proclaiming his love for her. As a result, Ruggia was expelled from the Société des réalisateurs de films, the guild for French directors. Though Haenel had explicitly chosen not to go to the police with her accusations, citing the justice system as "usually condemning so few sexual offenders" and "only one rape out of a hundred" and stating that "the justice ignores us, we ignore the justice", the publicity garnered by her interviews about the abuse led the Paris prosecutor's office to announce they were investigating Ruggia. Haenel later changed her mind about working with the police and officially filed a complaint against Ruggia in late November 2019. In January 2020, the police officially charged Ruggia with sexual aggression against a minor by a person of authority and sexual harassment.

On 28 February 2020, Haenel, along with Céline Sciamma, Noemie Merlant, and Aïssa Maïga, walked out of the 45th César Awards ceremony after Roman Polanski, who was convicted of raping 13-year old Samantha Geimer, won the award for Best Director for his film An Officer and a Spy''. As Haenel left, she waved her fist and shouted "La honte!" ("Shame!"), and after exiting the auditorium, she was filmed clapping sarcastically and shouting "Bravo la pédophilie!" ("Bravo, paedophilia!").

Filmography

Theatre

Bibliography

Essays

Awards and nominations

References

External links 

1989 births
Living people
French film actresses
French television actresses
21st-century French actresses
French people of Austrian descent
People from Paris
Actresses from Paris
French stage actresses
French people of German descent
Most Promising Actress Lumières Award winners
Best Supporting Actress César Award winners
Best Actress César Award winners
French lesbian actresses
French feminists
21st-century LGBT people